Mány is a town in Hungary, located in the north-east of Fejér County in the Zsámbéki Basin.

History

In the Middle Ages Mány was in Esztergom county. Mány and Örs were completely destroyed in the first decades of the Turkish occupation.
From 1611 there was a Batthyány estate, but in 1680 Batthyány family pledged their estates in Mány and Bicske. In 1703 Mány was moved to Fejér County.

Archaeology 
In August 2022, archaeologists from the Szent István Király Múzeum announced the discovery of a Bronze Age cemetery with 8 burials. One of the burials contained the remains of an outstanding young woman buried with small ceramic pots and 38 adorned gold and bronze decorative jewelry, such as gold rings, torcs, spiral shaped armlets, a gold hair ring.

Relations
Mány's German sister city is Leimen.

References

External links
 Street map 
 Many.hu 

Populated places in Fejér County
Hungarian German communities